The Tracy Woodframe Grain Elevator was a grain elevator in Muncy, Oklahoma. The elevator was built in 1931 along the Beaver, Mead & Englewood Railroad, the same year Tracy was founded. The elevator operated continuously from its opening until around  1983, outlasting the railroad  only a mere 10 years after the last train left eastbound in 1972. On May 13, 1983, the elevator was added to the National Register of Historic Places. The elevator has fallen down. All that remains is a scalehouse that was possibly remnant of a depot for the railroad.

References

External links

Agricultural buildings and structures on the National Register of Historic Places in Oklahoma
Buildings and structures completed in 1930
Buildings and structures in Texas County, Oklahoma
Grain elevators in Oklahoma
Agricultural buildings and structures on the National Register of Historic Places
National Register of Historic Places in Texas County, Oklahoma